Basil Green Motors (VIN: BG) is a former car manufacturer and racing team which is located in Edenvale, Gauteng near Johannesburg, South Africa. The company has specialised in Ford vehicles, in which the manufacturer's models are recognised by the brand name Perana added to the model name. The name Perana is a deliberate misspelling, as Piranha already had been protected. Currently the company is active as a dealer of Ford and Mazda vehicles.

Founded in 1967 by Basil Green the company dealt with engine tuning of Ford vehicles and participated in a variety of races as racing team. After winning several races the Ford Motor Company became aware of the company and used the company for some of the South African models as a kind of in-house tuner.

Cortina Mk II

The first model of the manufacturer was the Ford Cortina Perana V6, which was launched in 1967 as a tuning model. Production began one year later in the summer. Grosvenor Motors, then the largest Ford dealer in South Africa, took over the sales. The price was 2950 Rand. The standard version was based on the Ford Cortina Mk II GT. For the units ordered by the Gunston Cigarette Company, the Ford Cortina XL was used as basis. The Ford Essex engine with 2994 cc was used as engine. This was taken from the Ford Zephyr as well as the powertrain. After the conversion and lowering the Cortina Perana V6 was 64 kg heavier than the Ford standard model. Recognition features of the Cortina Perana V6 are a black strip over the bonnet, a black front grille and black coloured rims.

Escort Mk I

The second model of the manufacturer was 1968 the sports car Ford Escort Perana. Ford wanted to use the RS 1600, but the Cosworth BDA engine proved too complex for South Africa. So Basil Green made new plans and fitted the four cylinder engine of the Ford Pinto.

The removed RS 1600 engines Basil Green sold for 695 Rand as ideal for among others the Escort.

Capri Mk I

The next model, the Ford Capri Perana came out in 1969 as V6 version. About 20 units of this model were built; the top speed was 186 km/h. As Ford offered the Essex engine as standard from 1970 on, Basil Green had to take a more powerful engine. So he replaced the V6 with the Windsor V8 of the Ford Mustang.

Technically the Capri Perana was a mix of the Australian Ford Falcon (XW) and the American Ford Mustang. It was sold with a 4 speed Ford Toploader transmission and the 3 speed C4 automatic transmission. In the beginning the price for this car was 4,450 Rand.

Top speed was 228 km/h, acceleration from 0 to 100 km/h was possible in 6.7 seconds (automatic version 7.0 sec).

Officially the Capri Perana was only sold in "Bright Yellow" and "Piri Piri Red", but some cars were painted in different colours, for example Basil Green's Perana naturally was green.

The cars were manufactured by Ford of South Africa (a subsidiary of the Ford Motor Company of Canada). Production ended in 1973.

Racing

Based on the Capri Perana V8 racing cars were built for the South African Saloon Car Championship. The Z 181 was the only Group 5 car and won 13 of 14 races in the 1970 season and topped the lap records on every course.

After a change of the rules to stop this dominance, Basil Green built 6 cars for the Group 2. One of these cars won the championship in 1971, the A2 in 1972.

Z 181 and A2 were sponsored by the Gunston Cigarette Company, while the others were driven by private drivers.
Technical modifications were made especially to the engine. It got 4x48 down draft twin choke Weber carburetors and had about 400 hp. Top speed was higher than 250 km/h.
Brakes stayed the same as in V6 Capris, except that racing pads were built in.
C-shaped single leaf springs were used at the rear axle to allow room for the 14.5" rims.

z181 is owned by the scribante family in RSA. A2 was found in Rhodesia and rebuilt by a collector near Cape Town. One of the other cars had an accident at the Kyalami Grand Prix Circuit with Basil Green at the wheel and were never rebuilt. What happened to the other cars is not known.

Cortina Mk III
When the Cortina Mk III came out Basil Green brought the second generation of the Cortina Perana V6 on the South-African market in 1972. These models, also known as Cortina Big Six, got the same engines as their predecessors.

Granada Mk I

Introduced in 1973 the Ford Granada V8 has been the only model by Basil Green Motors not getting the name Perana. The engine was the Windsor V8 with 302 cui (5 litres). Transmission has been automatic or manual. With a top speed of 207 km/h and an acceleration of 7.8 seconds from stand to 100 km/h the car became the favourite of Ford's chairman Lee Iacocca. Ford Cologne bought two of these cars to explore if they were suitable for the European market. The oil price shock ended these plans.

Escort XR3

After years without a change in the model range Basil Green Motors presented the Escort XR3 in 1980. For the first time in the corporate history the performance increase was not by a change of the engine but classic tuning like another carburettor. Maximum speed of the Perana XR3 was 183 km/h.

Sapphire

2 years later Basil Green Motors presented the Ford Sapphire Perana. A few years later this car was produced by Samcor to satisfy the demand. The Sapphire was available as a 3.0 litre- (222 km/h) and a 3.4-litre- (236 km/h) version. The Sapphire 3.4 was produced by JT Development.

Movies
 Ford Capri Perana V8 at a 1/4-mile run on the Santa Pod Raceway

External links 
 Official website of the Basil Green Motors: Ford/Mazda
 Basil Green Perana enthusiasts' site
 Basil Green Motors on capri-v8.de
 The Ford Capri Perana on uniquecarsandparts.com.au
 The Ford Capri Perana on capri-perana.co.za
 The Ford Capri Perana on carsablanca.de

South African auto racing teams
Car manufacturers of South Africa
1967 establishments in South Africa
Vehicle manufacturing companies established in 1967
Sport in Gauteng
Companies based in Germiston

fr:Perana#La première époque